The canton of Brie-Comte-Robert is a French former administrative division, located in the arrondissement of Melun, in the Seine-et-Marne département (Île-de-France région). It was disbanded following the French canton reorganisation which came into effect in March 2015.

Demographics

Composition 
The canton of Brie-Comte-Robert was composed of 12 communes:

Brie-Comte-Robert
Chevry-Cossigny
Coubert
Évry-Grégy-sur-Yerre
Férolles-Attilly
Grisy-Suisnes
Lésigny
Limoges-Fourches
Lissy
Servon
Soignolles-en-Brie
Solers

See also
Cantons of the Seine-et-Marne department
Communes of the Seine-et-Marne department

References

Brie-Comte-Robert
2015 disestablishments in France
States and territories disestablished in 2015